This is a list of seasons played by Parma Calcio 1913, an Italian professional football club currently playing in Serie B based in Parma, Emilia-Romagna. It details Parma's achievements in major competitions, together with the top scorers for each season of their existence up to the most recent completed  season. Top scorers in bold were also the top scorers in the league that season. Parma have never won a domestic league title, but have won three Italian Cups, one Supercoppa Italiana, as well as two UEFA Cups, one European Super Cup and one UEFA Cup Winners' Cup. The club won all eight of these trophies between 1992 and 2002, a period in which it is also achieved its best ever league finish as runners-up in the 1996–97 season.

As of 2022, although Parma have spent just 27 seasons in Serie A, they have amassed the fifteenth-most points in the league's history and have the fifteenth-best average points total per season in the division (assuming 3 points for a win throughout its history), whose inception was in 1929. Since 1929, Parma have spent 27 seasons in the top flight of Italian football, 29 at the second level, 32 at the third and 5 at the fourth.

History 
The club was founded as Parma Foot Ball Club in December 1913. At this time Parma's matches were less well-organised and arranged on a largely ad-hoc basis. Official records from these matches are sketchy at best. The club began playing league football in 1919 and became founder members of Serie B in 1928. The club would then be renamed Associazione Sportiva Parma in 1932. Much of the next few decades was spent in the doldrums; a time which included the absorption of A.C. Parmense and another rename to Associazone Club Parma in 1968 due to financial difficulties.

Easily Parma's most successful period followed promotion to Serie A in 1990 under Nevio Scala. Scala remained at the club until 1996 and won the Crociati'''s first ever major trophies – securing one Coppa Italia, one UEFA Cup Winners' Cup, one UEFA Cup and one Supercoppa Italiana win. Four more triumphs – two in the Coppa Italia, one in the UEFA Cup and another in the Supercoppa Italiana – followed before 2002. The club became embroiled in financial disaster after the fraud of the Parmalat and A.C. Parma owners came to a head soon after and no major trophies have been won since. The club was re-founded as Parma Football Club'' in 2004 and a sale to current owner Tommaso Ghirardi in early 2007.

Key 

Pld = Matches played
W = Matches won
D = Matches drawn
L = Matches lost
GF = Goals for
GA = Goals against
Pts = Points
Pos = Final position

DNQ = Did not qualify
Grp = Group stage
QR1 = First qualifying round
QR2 = Second qualifying round
QR3 = Third qualifying round
PO = Play-off round
1R = First round
2R = Second round
3R = Third round
R32 = Round of 32
R16 = Round of 16

QF = Quarter-finals
SF = Semi-finals
RU = Runners-up
W = Winners

Seasons

Footnotes

References 

 
Parma Calcio 1913
Parma F.C.